"Nothin' New Under the Moon" is a song written Tom Shapiro, Josh Leo and Rick Bowles, and recorded by American country music artist LeAnn Rimes.  It was released on August 1, 1998 as the second single from her album Sittin' on Top of the World.  The song placed at number 10 on the US country charts.

Charts

Year-end charts

References

1998 singles
1998 songs
LeAnn Rimes songs
Songs written by Josh Leo
Songs written by Tom Shapiro
Curb Records singles
Songs written by Rick Bowles